Nathan James Barnatt (born February 2, 1981) is an American actor, comedian, dancer, YouTuber, singer, and filmmaker. He is best known for his famous comic characters Keith Apicary and "Dad".

Career 
Barnatt appeared on Comedy Central's The Gong Show with Dave Attell in 2008, on Comedy Central's Ghosts/Aliens pilot in 2009, and on This Show Will Get You High in 2010. In 2012, Barnatt developed a show with Adult Swim based on his Keith Apicary character called Youth Large. The Youth Large pilot was written by Barnatt, his brother Seth, and Paul Cummings (who is also the director). However, Adult Swim passed on the pilot but it was released online in August 2014. Since then Barnatt has sold shows to television networks Nickelodeon, Amazon, Comedy Central, Fox and Viceland.

Barnatt is a performer at the Upright Citizens Brigade theater in Hollywood California. He is also an amateur dancer, as displayed in his videos including a Kimberly Cole audition session. Because of his dancing and physical comedy skills, he was set to be the lead dancing clown for Michael Jackson's canceled This Is It concerts before dropping out to work on a Comedy Central pilot.

His popularity in the Kimberly Cole audition video has led him to appear in the music video for Kimberly Cole's "U Make Me Wanna" in his Keith Apicary character. Barnatt also appeared in character in a music video for "Let It Roll" by Flo Rida and "Paradise" by Laidback Luke. He appears in character in the music video for "Freestyle" by country music group Lady Antebellum.

In 2012, Barnatt was featured on the front cover of LA Weekly magazine, covering his success on YouTube. In 2013, Barnatt provided voice work on the Animation Domination show High School USA! as one of the main characters, Lamort Blackstein.

In 2015, Barnatt played a police officer in the music video for "Sugar" by Robin Schulz.

In June 2016, Barnatt appeared as a guest on the Let's Play webseries Game Grumps. And in November 2016, Barnatt appeared in an episode of James & Mike Mondays, alongside his good friend James Rolfe, whom he worked with on Rolfe's 2014 film Angry Video Game Nerd: The Movie. On December 20, 2016, he again appeared as his character Keith Apicary in a Christmas episode of the Angry Video Game Nerd episode where he dresses up as Will Ferrell's character from Elf in order to secure Santa's gifts, and he and the Nerd play a variety of games with different Sega Genesis accessories while destroying the set in a slapstick fashion. He also appears in a short film by James Rolfe (a.k.a. Angry Video Game Nerd) called "Flying Fuckernauts vs. the Astro Bastards" as one of two Fuckernauts alongside Rolfe playing the other one.

In July 2018, Barnatt played a fast-talking salesman trying to sell a faceless customer a copy of a fictional game called Finger GunZ.  However, the customer is repeatedly drawn to the gameplay of Sonic Mania Plus. Deliberately edited to look and sound like a 1990s commercial, the customer talks about all the features of Sonic Mania Plus and its low price while Barnatt repeatedly tries to sell Finger GunZ with comments taking direct jabs at the games industry.

In 2019, Barnatt created a YouTube channel called Dad, featuring the web series Dad Feels following a character named Dad. Though it is often called an alternate reality game (ARG), Barnatt disowns the term. The series has concluded its first season consisting three acts in December 2020. The series was a surprising success for Barnatt, who was experiencing financial struggles severe enough that he prepared to live in his van.

In August 2019, Barnatt appeared as a guest on an episode of Rental Reviews in which they reviewed the 1971 film Duel, and appeared again in September 2019, this time reviewing the 1982 film First Blood both as himself and Keith Apicary.

In June 2021, Barnatt appeared on season 16 of America's Got Talent as his character Keith Apicary where he received four "yes" votes from the judges for his dance routine.  On the semi-final live show broadcast August 25, 2021, Apicary did not make it through to the next round.

In May 2022, Barnatt participated in the Creator Clash boxing event in character as "Dad", winning his match against Matt Watson by TKO in 22 seconds.

Boxing record

Filmography

Television

Discography

Studio albums

Singles

See also 
 Talking Classics

References

External links 
 
 

Living people
1981 births
American male film actors
American male television actors
Male actors from Massachusetts
American male comedians
21st-century American comedians
American Internet celebrities
America's Got Talent contestants
YouTube boxers